Sundog Solar is a solar energy company based in Chatham, NY, and Midcoast Maine in Searsport. Sundog installs photovoltaic and solar hot water systems on homes and businesses.  The company also provides a spray foam insulation installation service.

Facilities 
Sundog is based out of a factory warehouse that is shared with Kling Magnetics.  The building is part of a complex that used to be the Columbia Box Board Mill, and is powered by 37.6 kW photovoltaic system and heated with vegetable oil.

History 
In 1997, Sundog Solar's owner Jody Rael bought the Chatham property from the Columbia Box Board paper mill company.  In 2007 the company invested $250,000 to make their  manufacturing and office facility carbon-neutral.

Media coverage 
 The Register Star - SunDog Solar to take part in National Solar Tour for first time
 The Register Star - - Congressman Murphy presents SunDog Solar with $50K USDA grant
 NYInc - SunDog Solar Eliminates Upfront Solar Electric Costs In New Residential/Commercial/Nonprofit Program SunDog Solar Eliminates Upfront Solar Electric Costs in New Residential Commercial Nonprofit Program
 Green Real Estate Daily - Q&A: Jody Rael, owner and president of Solaqua Power and Art 
 Berkshire Living - Green Zone

References 

Solar energy companies of the United States
Companies based in Columbia County, New York
American companies established in 2006
Energy companies established in 2006
Renewable resource companies established in 2006
2006 establishments in New York (state)